Epermenia philorites is a moth in the family Epermeniidae. It was described by John David Bradley in 1965. It is found in Uganda.

References

Epermeniidae
Moths described in 1965
Moths of Africa
Lepidoptera of Uganda